10th Brigade may refer to:

Australia
 10th Brigade (Australia)

Canada
 10th Canadian Infantry Brigade

Greece
 10th Mechanized Infantry Brigade (Greece)

India
 10th Cavalry Brigade (British Indian Army), of the British Indian Army in the First World War, distinct from the one below
 10th Indian Cavalry Brigade, of the British Indian Army in the First World War, distinct from the one above
 10th Artillery Brigade (India), of Northern Command (India)

Malaysia
 10 Paratrooper Brigade (Malaysia)

New Zealand
 10th Infantry Brigade (New Zealand)

Poland
 10th Armoured Cavalry Brigade (Poland)
 10th Motorized Cavalry Brigade (Poland)

Romania
 10th Engineer Brigade (Romania)

South Africa 

 10 Artillery Brigade (South Africa)

Ukraine
 10th Mountain Assault Brigade (Ukraine)

United Kingdom
 10th Armoured Brigade (United Kingdom)
 10th Infantry Brigade (United Kingdom)
 10th Mounted Brigade (United Kingdom)
 10th Tank Brigade (United Kingdom)
 10th Brigade Royal Field Artillery, 6th (Poona) Division
 X Brigade, Royal Horse Artillery

United States
 10th Sustainment Brigade (United States)